Touhy is an unincorporated community in Saunders County, Nebraska, United States.

History
Touhy was platted in 1892 when the Union Pacific Railroad was extended to that point. It was named for Patrick Touhy, a railroad official.

A post office was established at Touhy in 1892, and remained in operation until it was discontinued in 1956.

References

Unincorporated communities in Saunders County, Nebraska
Unincorporated communities in Nebraska